Albert Buckner Cowden (November 15, 1879 – November 23, 1958) was an American football and basketball coach.  He was the first head football coach at Kansas Wesleyan University in Salina, Kansas, serving for the 1903 and 1905 seasons and compiling a record of 6–4; the school did not field a team in 1904.

Head coaching record

Football

References

1879 births
1958 deaths
Kansas Wesleyan Coyotes football coaches
Kansas Wesleyan Coyotes men's basketball coaches